Sistenup Peak is a low peak at the northeast end of the Kirwan Escarpment, about 5 nautical miles (9 km) north of Sistefjell Mountain, in Queen Maud Land. Mapped by Norwegian cartographers from surveys and air photos by Norwegian-British-Swedish Antarctic Expedition (NBSAE) (1949–52) and air photos by the Norwegian exp (1958–59) and named Sistenup (last peak).

Mountains of Queen Maud Land
Princess Martha Coast